Flavobacterium beibuense  is a bacterium from the genus of Flavobacterium which has been isolated from sediments from the Beibu Gulf in China.

References

External links
Type strain of Flavobacterium beibuense at BacDive -  the Bacterial Diversity Metadatabase

 

beibuense
Bacteria described in 2011